"Can't Get This Stuff No More" is a song on American hard rock band Van Halen's 1996 compilation Best Of – Volume I. 
The song was one of two new songs recorded exclusively for the album (the other being "Me Wise Magic").

Recording
As Eddie Van Halen and David Lee Roth got in touch again due to the upcoming compilation, Eddie decided to invite Roth to perform on two new songs. The music for this song was based on a track called the "Backdoor Shuffle" which was originally part of the sessions for the Balance album. "Can't Get This Stuff No More" is also Eddie Van Halen's only use of a talk box, which was actually operated by guitar technician Matt Bruck as Eddie felt "it just sounded like a wah-wah" when he used it himself.

Release
The song was written and recorded by the reunited original members Eddie Van Halen, Alex Van Halen, David Lee Roth and Michael Anthony, and subsequently released on Van Halen's 1996 compilation Best Of – Volume I.  The reunion fell apart a month before the release of Best of Volume I.

References

1996 songs
1997 singles
Van Halen songs
Songs written by Michael Anthony (musician)
Songs written by David Lee Roth
Songs written by Eddie Van Halen
Songs written by Alex Van Halen
Song recordings produced by Glen Ballard
Warner Records singles